Sir Larry Alan Siedentop  (born 24 May 1936) is an American-born British political philosopher with a special interest in 19th-century French liberalism. He is the author of Democracy in Europe and an occasional contributor to several major British daily newspapers, including the Financial Times and The Times.

Born in Chicago, Siedentop attended Hope College, a liberal arts college in Michigan affiliated with the Reformed Church in America, and Harvard University, where he received his Master of Arts degree. He then received, as a Marshall Scholar, a Doctor of Philosophy degree from the University of Oxford for a thesis on the thought of Joseph de Maistre and Maine de Biran, written at Magdalen College, Oxford, under the supervision of Sir Isaiah Berlin.

From 1965 to 1968, Siedentop was a Research Fellow at Nuffield College, Oxford, but he spent most of his academic career as a Fellow of Keble College, Oxford, and a University Lecturer. After retiring from Oxford, Siedentop was a visiting fellow at the Netherlands Institute for Advanced Study in Wassenaar, Queen Victoria Eugenia Professor at the Complutense University of Madrid and a visiting fellow in Philosophy and Public Affairs at the University of St Andrews.

Siedentop was appointed Commander of the Order of the British Empire (CBE) in 2004 for services to political thought and higher education, and was knighted in the 2016 Birthday Honours for services to political science.

Reception

Siedentop's third book, Inventing the Individual: The Origins of Western Liberalism (2014), was praised by both The Wall Street Journal for "attempting to trace a lost genealogy" of "modern secularism, and its freedoms, as Christianity's gift to human society", and by The Guardian as "A remarkable book that will change the way you think about our concept of ourselves."

In his lifelong work on French political liberalism, Samuel Moyn reflects in the Boston Review that Siedentop, "in making the case for modern liberty," focuses on "nineteenth-century French thinkers such as Benjamin Constant, François Guizot, and Alexis de Tocqueville" who "cast liberal values such as individual freedom as complex social achievements won over long periods, to be treasured and fostered precisely because they reflect collective advancement, not merely moral truth" and which "suggests that history and experience are central to" his "story about how we came to defend liberal values, through what institutions and practices."

Selected publications

Books as author
 , (Google Books) 
  (Google Books) 
  (Google Books)

Books as editor
 translator: 
 (with David Miller):  , which is a collection of essays by and about political philosopher John Plamenatz.

Papers as author

Newspaper articles

References

1936 births
Living people
Hope College alumni
Harvard University alumni
Alumni of Magdalen College, Oxford
Fellows of Keble College, Oxford
Complutense University of Madrid
American political philosophers
Knights Bachelor
Commanders of the Order of the British Empire
American emigrants to England
Naturalised citizens of the United Kingdom
People from Chicago